Valor Security Services of Marietta, GA, a division of SMS Holdings Nashville, TN, was the number one company in the United States that provided contract security services exclusively to the shopping center industry. In 2013, Valor ranked as the nation's 11th largest security firm in Security Magazines ranking of the 50 largest security firms (determined by Valor's annual revenue of $175 million).

Valor was founded in 1991 by Dan Rakestraw. Mr. Rakestraw served as President until February 4, 2015 when Valor Security Services was purchased by Universal Protection Service. Valor was a national provider of security management services and risk management services to over 400 properties and employed 8,000 people.

References

External links
Valor Security official site
SMS Holdings
Valor Security Hospitality SmartBrief
Mall Security Focus of Greater Attention; Valor Security Services Focusing on Training, Technology
2013 Rank of US Security Firms

Companies based in Nashville, Tennessee
Security companies of the United States